Bob Carey is the name of:

 Bob Carey (racing driver) (1904–1933), American race car driver
 Bob Carey (American football) (1930–1988), American football player
 Bob Carey (singer), American folk singer, member of The Tarriers

See also
Robert Carey (disambiguation)